Derek Henderson (9 March 1926 – 13 June 2019) was an English first-class cricketer and educator.

Henderson was born at Bexhill-on-Sea in March 1926. After attending St Edward's School, Oxford, he went up to Trinity College, Oxford. He made his debut in first-class cricket for Oxford University in 1949 against Lancashire at Fenner's. He played first-class cricket for the university until 1950, making a total of eleven appearances. Primarily a medium-fast bowler, Henderson took 30 wickets for the university at an average of 25.90, with best figures of 4/39. While at Oxford, he won a Blue in cricket. He also made four appearances in first-class cricket for the Free Foresters from 1951–1954, with all four matches coming against Oxford University.

After graduating from Trinity College, Henderson began a career in teaching. He and Hugh Watts purchased the Moor Park Estate in Shropshire in 1964, where they founded the Moor Park School. Henderson was its headmaster until he retired in 1988. He lived near Oxford after he retired. His son, Steve Henderson, also played first-class cricket.

References

External links

1926 births
2019 deaths
People from Bexhill-on-Sea
People educated at St Edward's School, Oxford
Alumni of Trinity College, Oxford
English cricketers
Oxford University cricketers
Free Foresters cricketers
Schoolteachers from Sussex
Founders of English schools and colleges
20th-century philanthropists